Xanatos may refer to:

David Xanatos, a character from Gargoyles
Xanatos, a character from the Star Wars: Jedi Apprentice books

See also
Thanatos, the Greek god of death